Beaver Cove is a small coastal community on Northern Vancouver Island, located on the cove of the same name.

Background
It is the northern terminus of the Englewood Railway, which is named via that of the Wood & English Logging Company, whose former logging camp, now abandoned, was Englewood, on the other side of Beaver Cove from today's community.  Also nearby, to the northeast on the southeast shore of Beaver Cove, is the community of Kokish.

See also
Beaver Cove (disambiguation)

References

Populated places in the Regional District of Mount Waddington
Unincorporated settlements in British Columbia